EuroBasket 2013 was the 38th edition of the EuroBasket championship that was organized by FIBA Europe. It took place from 4 September until 22 September 2013 in Slovenia. The number of participating teams was 24.

France defeated Lithuania in the final to win their first title. Tony Parker was named the tournament's MVP.

Host selection
Bosnia and Herzegovina, Croatia, Czech Republic, Germany, Italy and Slovenia brought forward a potential candidature for the FIBA EuroBasket. On , it was announced that only two countries, Slovenia and Italy had submitted formal bids. On , Italy announced its withdrawal from the run. The Basketball Federation of Slovenia (BFS) thus remained the only candidate organizer.

In March 2011, the BFS appointed the economist Aleš Križnar as the director of the event.

Format
In the first stage, every team had to play against every other team of their group (round-robin). This meant five matches per team.

From every group, the three best teams advanced to the second stage and the three worst teams were eliminated. In the second stage, two new groups were formed. The three best teams from groups A and B were united to form group E and the three best teams from groups C and D were united to form group F.

In these two new groups of the second stage only matches by teams that had not yet played each other have to be played. As for the matches that had already happened in the first stage, their results also counted in the second stage. Therefore, every team played three matches and there are 12 teams in the second stage.

Out of the second stage, the four best teams from each of the two groups advanced to the quarterfinals (8 teams in total) whereas the two worst teams will be eliminated from the championship (four teams in total).

Financing
The fee that Slovenia had to pay to FIBA Europe amounted to 6 million euros. According to the agreement, half of the money was paid by the Slovenian state.

Logo, official song and mascot of the championship

The official mascot was Lipko, whose name came from combining the Slovenian word for linden tree and the diminutive "ko". The word lipa is of Slavic origin. Lipko is spelt the same in every language and in every market where he is present.

Attendance

Preliminary round

Slovenia already beat record attendance of 155,336 after preliminary round for almost 20,000 more people from previous FIBA Eurobasket. The average attendance per game was 2,588 visitors.

Second round

Venues
On 24 March 2011, it was officially announced that the preliminary round would be played in Novo Mesto, Jesenice, Koper and Ptuj. Ljubljana, the capital of Slovenia, will host the final round at the Arena Stožice. On 18 June 2012, it was announced that the city council of Ptuj cancelled their bid for the tournament. Novo Mesto cancelled their bid on 2 July 2012. On 28 August 2012, it was confirmed that the preliminary round would be played in Celje and Ljubljana (Tivoli Hall) instead of Ptuj and Novo Mesto, which cancelled their bids.

Qualification

Olympic Games or Olympic Qualifying Tournament participants Spain, France, Russia, North Macedonia, Lithuania, Greece, Slovenia and Great Britain all qualified directly to the EuroBasket 2013 Final Round.

The 31 remaining teams were divided into 5 groups of 5 teams and 1 group of 6 teams. The first and second placed teams in each group plus the 4 best third placed teams were qualified for the Final Round.

The Qualifiers were played between 15 August and 11 September 2012.

The EuroBasket 2013 draw took place on 18 November 2012; first time in the history the draw took place underground – in the Concert Hall of Postojna Cave.

Qualified teams

Squads

Draw
The EuroBasket 2013 draw took place on 18 November 2012, first time in history the draw took place underground – in the Postojna Cave Concert Hall, divided the qualified teams into four groups of six, groups A, B, C, and D.
It was decided that games would take place in Celje, Jesenice, Koper and  Ljubljana. Included are the latest published FIBA World Rankings prior to the draw.

Preliminary round

Group A
Venue: Tivoli Hall, Ljubljana

Group B
Venue: Podmežakla Hall, Jesenice

Group C
Venue: Zlatorog Arena, Celje

Group D
Venue: Arena Bonifika, Koper

Second round

The two groups comprised the three best-ranked teams from Groups A, B, C and D. Teams coming from the same initial group did not play again vs. each other, but "carried" the results of the matches played between them from the first round.

The best four teams advanced to the quarterfinals.

Group E

Group F

Knockout stage

All games were held at Arena Stožice in Ljubljana, Slovenia.

5th place bracket

Quarterfinals

Classification 5–8

Semifinals

Seventh place game

Fifth place game

Third place game

Final

Final standings

All-Tournament Team
 PG –  Tony Parker (MVP)
 SG –  Goran Dragić
 SF –  Bojan Bogdanović
 PF –  Linas Kleiza
 C –  Marc Gasol

Statistical leaders
In order for players to qualify as statistical leaders for the tournament, they had to play in at least 6 games during the competition.

Points

Rebounds

Assists

Blocks

Steals

FIBA broadcasting rights
The tournament was broadcast in a record 167 countries around the globe (previous record is 162 countries).

References

External links

Official website

 
2013
2013–14 in European basketball
2013–14 in Slovenian basketball
2013
September 2013 sports events in Europe
Sports competitions in Ljubljana
2010s in Ljubljana
Sport in Koper
Sport in Jesenice, Jesenice
Sport in Celje